Guangzhou EHang Intelligent Technology Co. Ltd is a company based in Guangzhou, China that develops and manufactures autonomous aerial vehicles (AAVs) and passenger AAVs which have entered service in China for aerial cinematography, photography, emergency response, and survey missions.

History
EHang announced the Ehang 184, introduced at the Consumer Electronics Show in January 2016, as the world's first AAV capable of carrying passengers.

The company announced plans with Dubai's Road & Transportation Agency in 2017 to launch an autonomous flying-taxi service starting in the summer of 2017, but didn't succeed. The company has also worked on a project with Nevada's Institute for Autonomous Systems for an AAV taxi that can transport a single passenger for up to 23 minutes with the EHang 184.

In November 2018, an agreement was signed with the city of Lyon, France, to open a research center there. At the same time, a cooperation agreement was concluded with the Austrian aerospace group FACC to further develop, certify and produce for EHang in Europe as well.

On December 12, 2019 EHang was listed on the NASDAQ with the symbol EH. On March 18, 2020, EHang decided to go into a strategic partnership with Llíria, a Spanish city, using the marketing term urban air mobility. This includes tourism as well as logistics. The City Council and EHang will also work with the Spanish Aviation Safety and Security Agency. Llíria is the second city in Spain where EHang has an agreement.

Aircraft

Ghost
Ghost is a quadcopter developed by Ehang in a typical quadrotor layout with a pair of skids as landing gear. However, Ghost has an unusual feature: the rotors are mounted below the tips of the arms, instead of being mounted on top of the tips of the arms like most other multirotors. Ghost is mainly intended for aerial photography missions, and it is controlled by a smartphone. Its complete name is Ghost Intelligent Aerial Robot.

Hexacopter
Ehang Hexacopter is a UAV developed by Ehang and it has not yet been named. The existence of this hexacopter was revealed for the first time to the public when it made its public debut in August 2014 at TechCrunch Beijing. The yet-to-be-named hexacopter is constructed of carbon fiber composite material with a pair of skids as landing gear. The arms of this hexacopter are curved, as opposed to the straight arms of most multi-rotors currently on the market. The hexacopter is controlled by laptop computer.

EHang 184 

EHang says it started carrying passengers in 2015 and since made 40 journeys till releasing footage in February 2018.
It has eight propellers on four arms and by July 2018, 30 to 40 single pilot EHang 184 have been built.

EHang 216 

The 216 is a two-seater with 16 propellers in a coaxial double-baled design. It has made over 1,000 manned flights by July 2018 and its maximum range flown was 8.8 km (5.5 miles).
The aircraft is targeted for autonomous flying, to be monitored from an EHang or its customer command-and-control center.
Austrian aerostructures supplier FACC AG partnered with EHang to certify and produce the aircraft in Europe, within simpler certification requirements for takeoff weights below 600 kg (1,320 lb).

In October 2018, the CAAC approved initial passenger operations at specific locations to develop urban air taxis regulations.
EHang began taking preorders since, for island-hopping and to a Chinese coastal resort for aerial sightseeing within their site.
A  shuttle across the river of its home city of Guangzhou should avoid a 30 min drive due to traffic congestion on the downtown bridge.
US biotechnology company United Therapeutics, manufacturing organs for human transplants, should test rapid automated delivery from laboratory to hospital by the end of 2019.

In March 2020, the Norwegian Civil Aviation Authority issued a permit for manned test and certification flights. It is the first such approval in Europe.

On May 27, 2020, EHang obtained the world's first commercial pilot operation approval from the Civil Aviation Administration of China (“CAAC”) to use EHang 216 passenger-grade AAVs for air logistics purpose. The EHang 216 received a special flight operations certificate (SFOC) from Transport Canada Civil Aviation (TCCA) for test flights in Québec, Canada.

Firefighting from the air 
The EHang 216F is a version that can be used to fight fires from the air, especially in high-rise buildings. The maximum flight height is 600 m, it can carry up to 150 L of fire extinguishing. With a camera the fire is localized independently.

See also
 Flying car (aircraft)
 List of unmanned aerial vehicles of the People's Republic of China
 List of electric aircraft
 Joby
 Lilium
 Volocopter
 Vertical Aerospace

References

External links 
 EHang website
 

Unmanned aerial vehicles of China
Aircraft manufacturers of China
Manufacturing companies based in Guangzhou
2010s Chinese civil utility aircraft
Electric aircraft
EVTOL aircraft
Electric helicopters
Prototypes
Urban air mobility
Companies listed on the Nasdaq